Arda is an unincorporated community in Washington Township, Pike County, in the U.S. state of Indiana.

History
According to Ronald L. Baker, the community may be named after the  Arda River in Europe.

Geography

References

Unincorporated communities in Pike County, Indiana
Unincorporated communities in Indiana